Volunteer Police Cadets (VPC) is a nationally recognised uniformed police youth organisation which operates in most parts of the United Kingdom. It is one of several cadet youth organisations including the Army Cadet Force, Sea Cadets, Royal Marine Cadets, Air Training Corps and Fire Cadets. The Police Cadets teach young people skills in policing, and some may assist police officers with low-risk activities. The purpose of the VPC is not to recruit police officers of the future, but to encourage the spirit of adventure and good citizenship among its members.

The Police Cadets were founded in their current form by the Metropolitan Police Service in 1988 and are organised based on the territorial police forces. Membership is open to youths aged 13–18, and some branches include Junior Volunteer Police Cadets for those aged 10–13. Though advertised as giving an "insight" into British policing, it does not guarantee future employment.

The aims of the VPC are:
To promote a practical understanding of policing among all young people.
To encourage the spirit of adventure and good citizenship.
To support local policing priorities through volunteering and give young people a chance to be heard.
 To inspire young people to participate positively in their communities.

History
Police cadets were introduced in 1948, consisting of full-time frontline employees who were aged 16–19; changes were made to the new system in 1959. These Police Cadets had no powers of arrest but were able to assist their senior colleagues in many practical matters, such as taking statements, directing traffic, or offering crime prevention advice, as well as observing the work of their supervisors. In the late 1960s, Police Cadet training was revised and a national programme of intensive 10 month residential Cadet Training was introduced*. The courses provided Cadets with a mix of academic training together with outward bound, orienteering, self defence, swimming (life saving training at Bronze Medallion level and above), martial arts (e.g., judo) and other sporting activity training (e.g., including competitive inter-force Under 19 football, athletics,swimming and rugby tournaments). Military standard drill training was also a feature of Cadet training. On reaching the age of 19 (reduced to 18yrs 6 months in the mid 1970s), on completion of both Residential and local divisional / departmental training,successful Cadets were then appointed as Probationary Police Constables and continuing their training as such for a further two years. Most forces disbanded Cadet training by the early 1990s. Note that Cadets were paid a full time wage for the period of their training, with deductions towards the cost of their residential training taken from their monthly pay. *Periods served as Police Cadets did not count towards Police Service for long service awards or pension purposes.

Metropolitan Police
The Metropolitan Police was one of the first to introduce a cadet corps or force in 1948, intended to boost then-low recruitment levels (it was then 3,000 below its 'establishment' figure of 28,000, with officers working two of their monthly 'rest days' and being paid for this work). Granted its first commandant Andrew Croft in 1960, the Metropolitan Police Cadet Corps or Force was based originally in the former RAF Hendon buildings on Aerodrome Road and Police Cadets were all male aged 16 to 19 and they were paid a salary. They initially served two 'school terms' at Hendon and then transferred to another establishment at Ashford Kent until the first 'term' after their 18th birthday when they were attached to one of four Cadet Centres at Kingsbury, Sunbury, Norwood and Wanstead.

In 1968 the Hendon Police Cadet College opened on the corner of Aerodrome Road and Colindale Avenue almost directly opposite the gates to RAF Hendon. This was part of a wider transformation of the former RAF Hendon, with a new housing estate begun in 1970 and the new Peel Centre opened for police training in 1974. Serving cadets from the Metropolitan Police, Kent Police and Royal Ulster Constabulary, the new Cadet College building consisted of a purpose-built gymnasium, four accommodation blocks and an administration and training building. There was a large parade ground for the cadets to practice their drill.

In 1980 the ITV television network aired The Squad, a drama series which followed the fictional adventures of Metropolitan Police Cadets. The twelve episodes were produced by Thames Television.

1988 – Present Form
The present form of Police Cadets began in 1988. It was a community initiative that was supported by Commissioner Peter Imbert, who wanted to engage with young people. The first documented Volunteer Police Cadet unit started in South Norwood (Lambeth) in March 1988.

Organisation
All of the territorial police forces of England and Wales have a corresponding VPC branch, as does the British Transport Police. These are subdivided into local branches. There is a separate but similar scheme in Scotland called the Police Scotland Youth Volunteers, but no equivalent scheme exists in Northern Ireland.

The VPC is supported by a team, led by Chief Constable Shaun Sawyer of Devon & Cornwall Police. The team have developed the National Police Chiefs' Council supported framework, sharing the common Aims and Principles of the VPC programmes operating in police forces across the UK.

They support the VPC through funding; developing resources and training; producing opportunities for cadets and leaders. Sharing good practice amongst VPC members ensures police engagement and education of cadets, recognising the role of young people within their communities and policing.

Activities
Units normally meet at a local school or community venue once a week and are led by police officers, police staff and volunteers. In addition cadets develop their leadership skills by undertaking challenging social action projects in their communities with an expectation that they will volunteer three hours a month. Examples of these projects include supporting older members of the community in understanding cybercrime, fundraising for charities and road safety campaigns.

Cadets learn about:
 drill
 citizenship
 police powers and procedures
 first aid

VPC teams also take part in many events and activities in their communities, such as the London Marathon, Notting Hill Carnival, Remembrance Sunday and Armed Forces Day parades.

Cadets also take part in the Duke of Edinburgh's Award (DofE) and from 2019 will have the opportunity to participate in the UK Youth Achievement Awards.

Police Cadets have no special powers. Unlike the previous full-time cadets, they rarely assist the police in actual policing activities, and are never sent to high-risk situations.

Once they reach the age of 14, cadets may go out in public with police officers to take part in low-risk policing activities. Undercover cadets have been used to test if shops are willing to sell alcohol, tobacco and weapons to underage customers. They may also assist policing at large public events and provide crime prevention advice to local residents and businesses.

Uniform
There is no standardised uniform for the Police Cadets, with each parent police service providing their own uniform design. Generally, the uniforms avoid bearing too much resemblance to the uniforms of police officers, police community support officers, and other enforcement officers. They have tended to use badged polo shirts, a formal uniform shirt (which could be white or blue) with epaulettes bearing VPC insignia or cadet rank bars, and a beret, peaked cap, or baseball cap. Cadets are also issued with trousers and a fleece or coat.

Some cadets wear black ties and wear a brassard on their right arm.

Other Forces issue their VPCs with a light blue or red tie.

In Cambridgeshire, cadets wear a similar uniform to the old full-time cadets, but are issued with a navy blue combat-style sweater (marked 'Police Cadet') instead of a tunic; however, in Sussex their uniform is similar to a police officer's, with white shirt, tie, epaulettes, black trousers, and black shoes. They also have cadet jackets and a high visibility jacket. In Hertfordshire, cadets were issued with a light blue V-neck sweater, which had the county emblem embroidered on it. The Hertfordshire scheme has now changed and cadets wear a uniform similar to regular police officers, but with the word "cadet" embroidered on epaulette rank slides instead of a collar number and similarly the word "cadet" on the left breast reflective strip instead of the word "police".

Ranks
The highest rank is Head Police Cadet, with a Head Police Cadet normally having two deputies to assist them and temporarily act as their replacement if necessary. A Head Police Cadet is akin to a Chief Constable in a structural sense as the Head Police Officer and is often viewed as ‘the Chief Cadet’ and a potential future Chief Constable.

Ranks within Volunteer Police Cadet schemes vary considerably across Great Britain. Cadets appointed Mayor's Cadets are given a special badge or epaulettes to wear.

The epaulette is arranged in the order:
 Epaulette pin
 Phonetic code of the London Borough
 V.P.C band (light blue, placed through epaulette)
 Metal bar ( distinguishes rank )

The Volunteer Police Cadets have a few positions above the V.P.C standard ranks for people over the age of 18, such as:
 V.P.C Supervisor BandOver 18s who still want to assist in Cadets as Volunteer Police Cadet Leaders
 V.P.C Staff BandFor actively serving police officers who wear the V.P.C Uniform, which is fairly uncommon

Hampshire Constabulary
The Hampshire Constabulary Volunteer Police Cadet programme is divided into units consisting of around thirty cadets with a head cadet, deputy head cadet and team leaders. The rank insignia is worn on epaulettes on the shirts for formal occasions or ironed onto polo shirts which are used for less formal occasions. In 2018, Hampshire, Thames Valley Police, Sussex and Surrey standardised on uniforms and rank slides, although proliferation of the new uniform has been limited within Hampshire.

Leicestershire Police
Lord lieutenant cadet is the highest achieving rank to get, however it is very hard to achieve. Followed on by High Sheriff cadet, head cadet then deputy head cadet.
Each unit will have one head cadet, supported by 2 Deputy head cadets.

Every year ranks High Sheriff Cadet and Lord Lieutenant cadet are awarded to certain cadets following a decision by unit leader.

Thames Valley Police
In Thames Valley Police, the ranks are as follows: Cadet, Team Leader, Deputy Head Cadet, and Head Cadet.

Bedfordshire Police 
In Bedfordshire Police, the ranks are as follows: Cadet, Drill Cadet, Head Cadet, High Sheriff Cadet and Lord Lieutenant Cadet. Ranks are distinguished by metal bars (Two for Head Cadets and One for Drill Cadet) on epaulettes but previously it was stars with Drill Cadet having silver stars and Head Cadet having gold. Lord lieutenant cadet is the highest achieving rank to get, however it is very hard to achieve along with the High Sheriff cadet, These roles are picked by instructors along with the Lord Lieutenant (For the Lord Lieutenant cadet) and the High Sheriff (For the High Sheriff cadet). There are two Head and Drill cadets for the north and south of the county.

In late 2022, a new rank was introduced called Cadet Council where two cadets, two from north and two from south, will join into cadet instructor meetings and give the cadets a voice.

All of these roles' occupants change yearly.

Branches

Scotland
The equivalent of the Police Cadets in Scotland is the Police Scotland Youth Volunteers (PSYV). The PSYV is not part of the Volunteer Police Cadets framework, but is listed as a partner agency and carries out similar work.

Established in 2013 with five groups in Aberdeen, Cumnock, Dundee, Edinburgh and Glasgow, PSYV members volunteered at the 2014 Commonwealth Games in Glasgow and other public events. The program has quickly expanded and today there are now twenty groups across Scotland from Stranraer to Shetland, with plans to expand further.

London
The founder and the largest cadet scheme are operated by the Metropolitan Police Service, with over 5,000 cadets as of March 2016. It was founded in 1988 by Commissioner Peter Imbert. By 2010, every London borough had a VPC unit, along with a central support team within the Territorial Policing Command Unit. Metropolitan Police Cadets are involved in continuing further education, DofE, learning about the police service, carrying out attachments to divisions and specialist departments, learning first aid, and engaging in community work projects with the disabled and disadvantaged. London Police cadets annually compete in a police scenario completion, which was traditionally held in Hendon, in North London, for the annual Police Cadet Competition. This involved cadets competing in a range of police activities and scenarios, in which they were competitively assessed. In 2015 the Metropolitan Police announced that the Cadet Competition was no longer to be held at Hendon due to the resizing of Hendon; some of the land was sold off for development. However, the Annual Cadet Competition continues a long tradition at the Gravesend public order site. 2013 also saw the launch of Junior Police Cadets, which accepts young people from school Year 6 to Year 9, at which point they become eligible to join the senior VPC.

On Sunday 14 June 2009, the Metropolitan Police Volunteer Police Cadets took part in what is believed to have been the largest ever formal parade of young people, to celebrate the 22nd anniversary of the establishment of the Volunteer Police Cadet force in what was named as the "colour parade" and was carried out on Horse Guard's Parade. Each cadet troop was formally passed a Standard (flag) under the review of the Metropolitan Police Commissioner, Sir Paul Stephenson, and other senior officers of the Metropolitan Police. The parade also included the showing of vintage police vehicles, police dogs, and a static display of the Boys' Brigade's London Massed Bugle Band. Bands that lead the four columns of a total of 1,400 cadets (and various police cadet staff, most of whom also hold different roles within the Metropolitan Police) were Metropolitan Police Pipe Band, the Nottingham-shire Police Pipe Band, the British Airways Brass Band, and the Enfield District Scout Band.

In 2011, Mayor Boris Johnson supported expanding the Metropolitan Police VPC by calling for numbers to be doubled by 2015. The Metropolitan Police VPC changed the age range from 14–19 to 10–24, introducing the UK's first Junior Volunteer Police Cadets scheme. The expansion target was achieved in March 2016.

Schemes in operation
 Avon and Somerset Police
 Bedfordshire Police
 British Transport Police London, Birmingham and York 
 Cambridgeshire Police
 Cheshire Police
 City of London Police
 Derbyshire Constabulary
 Devon and Cornwall Police
 Dyfed-Powys Police
 Essex Police
 Gloucestershire Police
 Greater Manchester Police
 Hampshire Constabulary
 Hertfordshire Constabulary
 Humberside Police
 Isle of Man Police
 Kent PoliceSeven Cadet Units: Canterbury, Dover, Maidstone, Tonbridge and Medway, Gravesend, Swanley 
 Lancashire Police
 Leicestershire Police
 Lincolnshire Police
 Merseyside PoliceForce-wide in April 2006. Operates seven scheme across Merseyside
 Metropolitan PoliceOperates thirty-two schemes across the Greater London area and Junior Cadets (yr6-yr8).
 Norfolk Police
 Northamptonshire Police
 Northumbria Police 
 North Wales PoliceForce-wide in June 2007
 North Yorkshire PoliceStarting in March 2015 as a two-year trial
 Nottinghamshire PoliceTrial scheme of 70 cadets in 2013, plans for expansion 2014
 Police Scotland
 South Yorkshire PoliceOperates four schemes in Barnsley, Doncaster, Rotherham and Sheffield.
 Suffolk Police
 Surrey Police
 Sussex Police
 Staffordshire Police
 Thames Valley Police
 Warwickshire Police
 West Mercia Police
 West Midlands Police 
 Wiltshire Police
 Gwent Police

Investigations into abuse
Accusations of sexual abuse of Cadets by Police have led to investigations in the Metropolitan Police and Greater Manchester Police.

See also
 Police support volunteer
 Police community support officer
 Special Constabulary

Other UK Cadet Organisations
 Air Training Corps
 Army Cadet Force
 Sea Cadet Corps
Royal Marines Cadets
 Volunteer Cadet Corps
 Combined Cadet Force
 Girls Venture Corps Air Cadets

References

External links
 Police Could You
 UK Police service portal
 Police Cadet forum
 Avon and Somerset Constabulary (Police Cadets)
 Bedfordshire Police Cadets
 Derbyshire Police Cadets
 Essex Police Cadets
 Greater Manchester Police Police Cadets
 Hertfordshire Constabulary Volunteer Police Cadets
 Merseyside Police Cadets
 Metropolitan Police Cadets
 Kingston Police Cadets
 Westminster Borough Police
 North Wales Police Volunteer Cadets
 Lancashire Police Cadets
 Lincolnshire Police Volunteer Cadets
 South Yorkshire Police Cadets
 Strathclyde Police Cadets Program
 Surrey Police Community Support Cadets
 Sussex Police Cadets
 West Mercia Police Cadets
 Color Parade Announcement - Metropolitan Police
 Gloucestershire Constabulary Cadet Reunion 26 October 2019

Police cadets
Youth organisations based in the United Kingdom
British Cadet organisations